Maria (died 9 November 1716) was a Curaçaoan slave and leader of a slave rebellion on Curaçao in the Dutch West Indies in 1716. 

Maria was a cook at the plantation St. Maria, owned by the Dutch West India Company, where she prepared the newly captured Africans to be sold into slavery. On 15 September 1716, the slaves of the plantation rebelled and killed some of the white staff, including women and children. Within 10 days the rebellion was subdued by the military from Willemstad. Her lover, the slave Tromp, stated under torture that Maria had planned the rebellion as she wanted revenge on the overseer Muller, who was responsible for the death of her spouse.

Maria was sentenced to death and executed by burning on 9 November 1716.

Possible wrongful accusation
As the only evidence used to tie Maria to the rebellion was an accusation extracted under torture - plus the fact that Maria maintained she was innocent throughout - its quite plausible that she was wrongfully accused. Torture has been proven by several studies to be an unreliable way to extract information.  So while her involvement can no longer be proved or disproved. We can say with confidence that the case against her was very weak.

In pop culture
- Song: Maria of Curaçao - Roseland En Why Cee

See also
List of slaves

References

  Han Jordaan, Maria, in: Digitaal Vrouwenlexicon van Nederland. URL: http://resources.huygens.knaw.nl/vrouwenlexicon/lemmata/data/Maria [13/01/2014]

1716 deaths
18th-century Dutch people
Executed Dutch people
Curaçao slaves
Women in war in the Caribbean
Rebel slaves
People executed by the Netherlands by burning
Year of birth unknown
Women in 18th-century warfare
Women in war in the Netherlands
18th-century executions by the Netherlands
18th-century people of the Dutch Empire
18th-century slaves
18th-century rebels